The Detroit Lions are a professional American football team based in Detroit. The Lions compete in the National Football League (NFL) as a member of the National Football Conference (NFC) North Division. The team plays their home games at Ford Field in Downtown Detroit.

The franchise was founded in Portsmouth, Ohio, as the Portsmouth Spartans, and joined the NFL on July 12, 1930. Amid financial struggles, the franchise was relocated to Detroit in 1934. The team were also renamed the Lions in reference to the city's Major League Baseball (MLB) franchise, the Tigers.

The Lions won four NFL Championship Games between 1935 and 1957, all prior to the Super Bowl era. Since the 1957 championship, the franchise has won only a single playoff game during the 1991 season and holds the league's longest postseason win drought. While they share the distinction of never appearing in a Super Bowl with the Cleveland Browns, Houston Texans, and Jacksonville Jaguars, they are the only franchise operational for the entirety of the Super Bowl era to have never made it, as well as the only NFC team to have not done so.

Franchise history

Logos and uniforms
Aside from a brief change to scarlet and black from 1948 to 1950 instituted by then head coach Bo McMillin, which was influenced by his years as coach at Indiana, the Lions' uniforms have basically remained the same since they moved to Detroit in 1934–silver helmets, silver pants, and either blue or white jerseys.

Glenn Presnell, the then last surviving member of the 1934 Lions, recalled that after the Portsmouth Spartans relocated to Detroit, team owner George A. Richards asked him and his wife to pick the Lions' colors from combinations that included red and white, orange and black, and blue and silver. The Presnells liked blue and silver the best, so Richards selected it. The blue used by the Lions is officially known as "Honolulu blue", which is inspired by the color of the waves off the coast of Hawaii.

There have been minor changes to the uniform design throughout the years, such as changing the silver stripe patterns on the jersey sleeves, and changing the colors of the jersey numbers. "TV numbers", which are auxiliary uniform numbers to help TV broadcasters identify players from the line of scrimmage, were added to the jersey sleeves in 1956. White trim was added to the logo in 1970, with outlines (white on the blue jersey, silver on the white jersey) added to the numbers in 1972; the color arrangement on the numbers on the blue jerseys was reversed in 1982. The silver facemasks became blue in 1984. In 1998, the team wore blue pants with their white jerseys along with grey socks but dropped that combination after the season. In 1999, the "TV numbers" on the sleeves were moved to the shoulders.

In 1994, every NFL team wore throwback jerseys, and the Lions' were similar to the jerseys used during their 1935 championship season. The helmets and pants were solid silver, the jerseys Honolulu blue with silver numbers and the jersey did not have "TV numbers" on the sleeves. The team wore solid blue socks and black cleats. The helmets also did not have logos, as helmets were simple leather back then. The Lions also wore 1950s-style jerseys during their traditional Thanksgiving Day games from 2001 to 2004 as the NFL encouraged teams to wear throwback jerseys on Thanksgiving Day.

In 2003, the team added black trim to their logo and jerseys. The face masks on the helmet changed from blue to black with the introduction of the new color. In 2005, the team introduced an alternate, black, jersey.

For 2008, the team dropped the black jersey in favor of a throwback uniform to commemorate the franchise's 75th anniversary. The throwback uniform became the team's permanent alternate jersey in 2009, replacing the former black alternate. The Lions officially unveiled a new logo and uniforms on April 20, 2009. The logo was given a flowing mane and fangs, while the typeface featured a modern font.

On February 1, 2017, the Lions announced a new typeface, logo, and the complete removal of the color black from the team identity. While the previous logo was retained, the border was changed from black to silver. The Lions then unveiled the new uniforms on April 13, 2017, which include blue pants for the first time since 1998, and an alternate all-silver uniform; the facemasks also became chrome. The Lions also added the initials "WCF" to the left sleeve as a permanent tribute to William Clay Ford, who owned the team from 1963 until his death in 2014. The sleeve addition replaces the black "WCF" patch on the left breast that was added after Ford's death.

On September 20, 2021, the Lions wore white pants with their road white uniforms against the Green Bay Packers. The white pants, which lacked striping, were previously worn during the "scarlet and black" era in the 1948 and 1949 seasons.

Thanksgiving Day tradition

In 1934, then team owner George A. Richards, who also was the owner of a major radio affiliate of the NBC Blue Network, WJR in Detroit, the forerunner to today's ABC, negotiated an agreement with NBC to carry his Thanksgiving games live across all of the network's stations. Since then, the tradition of the Lions playing on Thanksgiving has continued uninterrupted.

Players of note

Current roster

Retired numbers

Notes:
 1 The No. 56 was temporarily unretired with Schmidt's blessing when the Lions acquired linebacker Pat Swilling from the New Orleans Saints. No player has worn it since Swilling left.
 2 Posthumous. Hughes died of a heart attack during a game on October 24, 1971, and his No. 85 was withdrawn from circulation. Over the years, however, the number would return to circulation.

Special cases
 The Lions retired No. 93 for the 2009 season after Corey Smith disappeared, presumed dead, when a boat he was fishing in with friends capsized off the Florida coast. The Lions also wore 93 decals on their helmets that season. The number was assigned to Kyle Vanden Bosch in 2010.

Pro Football Hall of Fame members

Pride of the Lions
In 2009, the Pride of the Lions was established. The Pride of the Lions is the ring of honor for the franchise's greatest players.

75th Season All-Time Team
On November 9, 2008, the Lions honored the 75th Season All-Time Team during halftime against the Jacksonville Jaguars. The team was chosen via an online fan poll and selection committee. Bold indicates those elected to the Pro Football Hall of Fame.

Note:
 1 Hanson was active at the time of the selection.

Lions All-Time Team
On September 29, 2019, the Lions honored their All-Time Team in celebration of the NFL's centennial during halftime against the Kansas City Chiefs. The team was chosen via fan voting, contributions from the Detroit Lions Legends Community, team executives, and select members of the media. Bold indicates those elected to the Pro Football Hall of Fame.

Note:
 1 Stafford and Muhlbach were active at the time of the selection.

Michigan Sports Hall of Fame

Staff

Current staff

Head coaches

The Lions have had 30 head coaches throughout their franchise history. Their first head coach was Hal Griffen, who compiled a 5–6–3 (.464) overall record with the team of 1930. Wayne Fontes was the longest-tenured head coach in Lions history, serving from 1988 to 1996. The current head coach of the Lions is Dan Campbell, who was hired on January 20, 2021.

Offensive coordinators

Defensive coordinators

Special Teams coordinators

Rivalries
The Lions have had several division rivals in their existence. Their oldest rivals are the Chicago Bears and the Green Bay Packers, whom they have faced since 1930. The Minnesota Vikings have been in a division with Detroit ever since their inaugural season in 1961. Another notable longtime division opponent was the Tampa Bay Buccaneers (25 seasons from 1977 to 2001).

The Lions also have a preseason rivalry with the Cleveland Browns, dubbed the Great Lakes Classic.  The two teams have been playing for The Barge Trophy since 2002. The Lions and Browns had a solid rivalry in the 1950s, when they met four times for the NFL championship (Detroit won three of the matchups); they have met much less frequently during the regular season since the 1970 AFL–NFL merger due to the Browns' move to the AFC.

Radio and television

Radio

The Lions' flagship radio station is WXYT-FM. Dan Miller does play-by-play, Lomas Brown does color commentary, and T. J. Lang is the sideline reporter.

In 2015, the team announced that they were moving from WXYT-FM to WJR for the 2016 NFL season, ending a 20-year relationship with CBS Radio. The decision to part with WXYT was reportedly instigated by a demand by the team for the station to fire on-air personality Mike Valenti, who has had a history of making critical comments about the Lions during his drivetime show, as a condition of any future renewal. A CBS Radio spokesperson stated that their refusal was meant to maintain the station's integrity.

The Lions' flagship station  returned to WXYT-FM starting with the 2021 season.

TV

Preseason

In 2015, WJBK took over from WXYZ-TV as the flagship station for Lions preseason games. In 2022, the announcers were Brandon Gaudin with play-by-play, Devin Gardner with color commentary, and Dannie Rogers with sideline reports. Games are produced by Bally Sports Detroit.

Regular season
Regular season games are broadcast regionally on Fox, except when the Lions play an AFC team in Detroit, in which case the game airs regionally on CBS; however, since 2014, with the institution of the NFL's "cross flex" broadcast rules, any Lions game slated to air on Fox can be moved to CBS. The Thanksgiving Day game in Detroit is always televised nationally. In 2011, the Lions became the last NFC team to play on NBC's Sunday Night Football since the network began airing Sunday night games in 2006.

Blackouts

The Lions' winless performance in 2008 and 2–14 season in 2009, coupled with the effects of the Great Recession in Michigan, led to several local broadcast blackouts, as local fans did not purchase enough tickets by the 72-hour blackout deadline. The first blackout in the then seven-year history of Ford Field was on October 26, 2008, against the Washington Redskins. The previous 50 regular season home games had been sellouts. The second home game of the 2009 season in which the Lions broke the losing streak, also against the Redskins, was blacked out locally, as well as the comeback victory over the Cleveland Browns. The Lions had only one blackout in 2010, yet another Redskins game, which the Lions won 37–25. However, in 2015, the NFL suspended its blackout policies, meaning that all Lions games will be shown on local TV, regardless of tickets sold.

Games were also often blacked out at the Lions' previous home, the 80,000-seat Pontiac Silverdome, despite winning seasons and the success and popularity of star players such as Barry Sanders.

Lions cheerleaders

On June 13, 2016, the Lions announced their decision to add official cheerleaders to the organization. The team also announced that Rebecca Girard-Smoker, formerly the director of the Detroit Pistons dance team, would be the coach of the cheerleading squad. It marked the first time in over 40 years the team had an official cheerleading squad. The cheerleading squad is a part of the entertainment during football games, and active at community events.

See also
 NFL on Thanksgiving Day
 History of the Portsmouth Spartans

Notes and references

Bibliography

External links

 
 Detroit Lions at the National Football League official website

 
Lions
American football teams in Michigan
Culture of Detroit
National Football League teams
American football teams established in 1934
Sports in Pontiac, Michigan
1934 establishments in Michigan